Qaleh Now Rural District is in Qaleh Now District of Ray County, Tehran province, Iran. At the National Census of 2006, its population was 33,115 in 8,139 households, when it was in Kahrizak District. There were 29,072 inhabitants in 7,582 households at the following census of 2011. At the most recent census of 2016, the population of the rural district was 23,710 in 3,959 households, by which time it was in Qaleh Now District. The largest of its eight villages was Gol Tappeh-ye Kabir, with 10,850 people.

References 

Ray County, Iran

Rural Districts of Tehran Province

Populated places in Tehran Province

Populated places in Ray County, Iran